The eastern billabongfly (Austroagrion watsoni) is a damselfly in the family Coenagrionidae.
It is also known as the eastern dart. Eastern billabongflies are small damselflies about 25mm (1 inch) in length. They are found near slow running water or still water, such as lakes, ponds and ditches. Male and female eastern billabongflies mate in a wheel position.

Identification 
The male eastern billabongfly has a bright blue thorax with black markings, and a long and slender black abdomen with blue rings and a blue tip. The female is a similar size to the male and is pale blue to grayish-green in colour. The antehumeral stripe of the female is a contrastingly bright green.

Behaviour 
Eastern billabongflies usually rest on plants either in a pond or at the waters edge, and sit very close to the water surface.  They are relatively quick flyers.

Similar species 
Eastern billabongflies appear similar to common bluetails and blue riverdamsels. Eastern billabongflies are smaller. Eastern billabongflies have a blue bar just behind their eyes where the common bluetail has two blue spots. The tips of the tails of eastern billabongflies have two black squares, whereas the common bluetail and blue riverdamsel tails are all blue. Eastern billabongflies have a green antehumeral stripe, where the common bluetail has a blue stripe. The eyes of an eastern billabongfly are mostly uniformly coloured, whereas common bluetails have bi-coloured eyes.

Distribution 
Eastern billabongflies are found throughout northern and eastern Australia, New Guinea, as well as on New Caledonia in the Pacific.

Gallery

References 

Eastern Billabongfly - Austroagrion watsoni
Australian Dragonflies Eastern Billabongfly

Coenagrionidae
Insects of Australia
Insects described in 1982